The 1977 Cal Poly Mustangs football team represented California Polytechnic State University, San Luis Obispo as a member of the California Collegiate Athletic Association (CCAA) during the 1977 NCAA Division II football season. Led by tenth-year head coach Joe Harper, Cal Poly compiled an overall record of 6–4 with a mark of 2–0 in conference play, winning the CCAA title for the second consecutive season. The Mustangs played home games at Mustang Stadium in San Luis Obispo, California.

Schedule

Team players in the NFL
The following Cal Poly Mustang players were selected in the 1978 NFL Draft.

Notes

References

Cal Poly
Cal Poly Mustangs football seasons
California Collegiate Athletic Association football champion seasons
Cal Poly Mustangs football